The World University Championships are organized by the Fédération Internationale du Sport Universitaire (FISU). 

In July, 2012, the first World University Netball Championship was held in Cape Town, South Africa. The South African Federation of University Sports organised the event. It is a women's indoor tournament with a maximum of 12 teams competing. 12 competitors and 5 officials are allowed per team. The venue of the first championship was the Good Hope Sports Centre in Cape Town, July 2–7, 2012. The winners were England, who beat South Africa in the finals.

The winners of the inaugural tournament were England, edging out South Africa in the grand final in a close game that went into overtime. Jamaica came 3rd, beating Ireland 41-30 for the bronze medal.

The 2nd World University Netball Championship was held in Miami, Florida in 2016. The venue was at St. Thomas University. Netball is a rapidly emerging sport in the United States and showcasing an international event will further its national prestige. The winners were South Africa over Jamaica. Australia defeated Uganda for bronze.

Champions

References

 
University
Recurring sporting events established in 2012
Netball